Belvedere is a rural locality in the Cassowary Coast Region, Queensland, Australia. In the  Belvedere had a population of 907 people.

Geography 
Belvedere is a low-lying locality (approx 10–20 metres above sea level) to the east of the Johnstone River. The Palmerston Highway forms the western boundary of the locality, joining the Bruce Highway at the northern tip of the locality. There is some suburban housing in the north-west and east of the locality with other areas used for farming crops including sugarcane.

History 
The name Belvedere was the name of the land development project and became the locality name on 2 June 1984. The name was chosen because the estate had good views just like a belvedere.

In the  Belvedere had a population of 907 people.

References 

Cassowary Coast Region
Localities in Queensland